Humphrey, Duke of Gloucester is a 1723 tragedy by the British writer Ambrose Philips. It is based on the life of Humphrey, Duke of Gloucester, youngest brother of Henry V.

The original Drury Lane cast included Barton Booth as Humphrey, Duke of Gloucester, John Mills as Richard, Duke of York, John Thurmond as the Earl of Salisbury, Colley Cibber as Cardinal Henry Beaufort, Charles Williams as the Earl of Warwick, William Mills as the Duke of Buckingham, Anne Oldfield as Margaret and Mary Porter as Eleanor, Duchess of Gloucester.

References

Bibliography
 Burling, William J. A Checklist of New Plays and Entertainments on the London Stage, 1700-1737. Fairleigh Dickinson Univ Press, 1992.

1723 plays
West End plays
Tragedy plays
Cultural depictions of dukes
Plays based on real people
Plays based on actual events
Plays by Ambrose Philips
Plays set in the 15th century
Plays set in England